The Turks and Caicos Islands are competed at the 2022 Commonwealth Games held in Birmingham, England. This was the Turks and Caicos Islands's 8th appearance at the Commonwealth Games.

Rosalie Ingham-Hall will serve as the team's chef de mission. The Islands are expected to compete in three sports: Athletics, Cycling and Swimming.

The Turks and Caicos Islands team consisted of 11 athletes (eight men and three women) competing in three sports. Athlete Courtney Missick and swimmer Arleigha Hall were the country's flagbearers during the opening ceremony.

Competitors
The following is the list of number of competitors participating at the Games per sport/discipline.

Athletics

Men
Track and road events

Field events

Women
Track and road events

Cycling

Road
Men

Swimming

Turks and Caicos Islands entered two swimmers (one male and one female)

References

Nations at the 2022 Commonwealth Games
Turks and Caicos Islands at the Commonwealth Games
2022 in the Turks and Caicos Islands